European route E21 is a series of roads in Europe, part of the United Nations International E-road network. 

It runs from Metz, France to Geneva, Switzerland. It meets the European route E25, the E50 and the E411 at Metz, from where it departs. On its way to Geneva, it crosses the E23 at Nancy, and also passes through Dijon. It enters Switzerland soon after and links with the E25, the E62 and the E712 at Geneva, allowing further travel through Europe.

External links 
 UN Economic Commission for Europe: Overall Map of E-road Network (2007)

21
E021
E021